Inoceramus (Greek: translation "strong pot") is an extinct genus of fossil marine pteriomorphian bivalves that superficially resembled the related winged pearly oysters of the extant genus Pteria. They lived from the Early Jurassic to latest Cretaceous.

Taxonomy 
The taxonomy of the inoceramids is disputed, with genera such as Platyceramus sometimes classified as subgenus within Inoceramus. Also the number of valid species in this genus is disputed.

Description 

Inoceramids had thick shells composed of "prisms" of calcite deposited perpendicular to the surface, and unweathered fossils commonly preserve the mother-of-pearl luster the shells had in life. Most species have prominent growth lines which appear as raised semicircles concentric to the growing edge of the shell.

In 1952, the huge specimen of Inoceramus steenstrupi 187 cm long, was found in Qilakitsoq, the Nuussuaq Peninsula, Greenland. This fossil is 83 Ma old, the Upper Santonian or Lower Campanian stage. Paleontologists suggest that the giant size of some species was an adaptation for life in the murky bottom waters, with a correspondingly large gill area that would have allowed the animal to survive in oxygen-deficient waters.

Selected species 

†I. aequicostatus 
†I. albertensis 
†I. altifluminis 
†I. americanus 
†I. andinus 
†I. anglicus 
†I. anilis 
†I. anomalus 
†I. anomiaeformis 
†I. apicalis 
†I. arvanus 
†I. bellvuensis
†I. biformis 
†I. brownei 
†I. carsoni 
†I. comancheanus
†I. constellatus 
†I. corpulentus 
†I. coulthardi 
†I. cuvieri 
†I. dakotensis
†I. dominguesi 
†I. dowlingi 
†I. dunveganensis 
†I. elburzensis 
†I. everesti 
†I. fibrosus 
†I. formosulus 
†I. fragilis 
†I. frechi 
†I. galoi 
†I. gibbosus 
†I. ginterensis 
†I. glacierensis 
†I. haast 
†I. howelli 
†I. incelebratus 
†I. inconditus 
†I. kystatymensis 
†I. lamarcki 
†I. lateris 
†I. mesabiensis 
†I. morii 
†I. multiformis 
†I. mytiliformis 
†I. nipponicus 
†I. perplexus 
†I. pictus 
†I. pontoni 
†I. porrectus 
†I. prefragilis 
†I. proximus'''' 
†I. pseudolucifer 
†I. quenstedti 
†I. robertsoni 
†I. saskatchewanensis 
†I. selwyni 
†I. sokolovi 
†I. steinmanni 
†I. subdepressus 
†I. tenuirostratus 
†I. triangularis'' 
†I. undabundus 
†I. ussuriensis 

 Distribution 

Species of Inoceramus had a worldwide distribution during the Cretaceous and Jurassic periods (from 189.6 to 66.043 Ma). Many examples are found in the Pierre Shale of the Western Interior Seaway in North America. Inoceramus'' can also be found abundantly in the Cretaceous Gault Clay that underlies London. Other locations for this fossil include Vancouver Island, British Columbia, Colombia (Hiló Formation, Tolima and La Frontera Formation, Boyacá, Cundinamarca and Huila), Spain, France, Germany, Afghanistan, Albania, Algeria, Angola, Antarctica, Argentina, Australia, Austria, Brazil, Bulgaria, Canada (Alberta, Northwest Territories, Nunavut, Saskatchewan, Yukon), Chile, China, Cuba, the Czech Republic, Denmark, Ecuador, Egypt, Greenland, Hungary, India, Indian Ocean, Iran, Italy, Jamaica, Japan, Jordan, Kenya, Libya, Madagascar, Mexico, Morocco, Mozambique, Nepal, New Caledonia, New Zealand, Nigeria, Papua New Guinea, Peru, Poland, the Russian Federation, Saudi Arabia, Serbia and Montenegro, South Africa, Sweden, Switzerland, Tunisia, Turkey, Turkmenistan, the United Kingdom, United States (Alabama, Alaska, Arizona, Arkansas, California, Colorado, Delaware, Idaho, Iowa, Kansas, Maryland, Minnesota, Mississippi, Montana, Nebraska, New Jersey, New Mexico, North Carolina, North Dakota, Oregon, South Carolina, South Dakota, Tennessee, Texas, Utah, Washington, Wyoming), and Venezuela.

Gallery

References

Bibliography

Further reading

External links 

 Upper Cretaceous Bivalvia of Alabama

Inoceramidae
Prehistoric bivalve genera
Jurassic bivalves
Cretaceous bivalves
Mesozoic Antarctica
Mesozoic animals of Africa
Mesozoic animals of Asia
Cretaceous molluscs of Europe
Prehistoric bivalves of North America
Mesozoic animals of South America
Mesozoic Chile
Cretaceous Argentina
Cretaceous Brazil
Cretaceous Colombia
Cretaceous Ecuador
Cretaceous Peru
Cretaceous Venezuela
Early Jurassic genus first appearances
Toarcian genera
Aalenian genera
Bajocian genera
Bathonian genera
Callovian genera
Oxfordian genera
Kimmeridgian genera
Tithonian genera
Berriasian genera
Valanginian genera
Hauterivian genera
Barremian genera
Aptian genera
Albian genera
Cenomanian genera
Turonian genera
Coniacian genera
Santonian genera
Campanian genera
Maastrichtian genera
Late Cretaceous genus extinctions
Fossil taxa described in 1814
Fossils of Serbia